Cameron Pilley (born 27 October 1982) is a former professional squash player from Australia. He reached a career-high world ranking of World No. 11 in January 2011.

Pilley was born in Grafton, New South Wales. From 2001 to 2005, he attended the Australian Institute of Sport on a squash scholarship, where he trained under Geoff Hunt and Rodney Martin. He announced his retirement from professional squash on 27 December 2019.

Career overview
As a junior player, Pilley won the Australian under-19 title twice and represented Australia in the World Junior Championships. In 2006, he finished runner-up in the mixed doubles event at the World Doubles Squash Championships, partnering with Amelia Pittock.

In 2008, he reached the final of the Canary Wharf Squash Classic, losing James Willstrop in the final 9–11, 11–9, 8–11, 11–6, 11–3.

In November 2010, he won the Dutch Open against Laurens Jan Anjema in the final 11–7, 11–9, 11–13, 14–12.

On 3 October 2011, Pilley hit a squash ball recorded as 175 mph, breaking the previous record set by John White by 3 miles per hour.

In May 2016, he reached the PSA World Series Finals. He beat Mohammad El Shorbagy in the semi-finals by a score of 2–0. He lost to Grégory Gaultier in the finals 3–1 on 28 May 2016.

Major World Series final appearances

Hong Kong Open: 1 final (0 title, 1 runner-up)

Commonwealth Games

Cameron Pilley is a three-time Commonwealth Games gold medallist for Australia. In Delhi in 2010 Pilley with Ryan Cuskelly won bronze in the men’s doubles, and he won gold in the mixed doubles with Kasey Brown. In Glasgow in 2014, Pilley and Brown won bronze in the mixed doubles, and he won a gold in the men’s doubles with David Palmer. In the Gold Coast games in 2018 he won gold with Donna Lobban in the mixed doubles.

References

External links 
 
 
 
 

1982 births
Living people
Australian male squash players
Commonwealth Games gold medallists for Australia
Commonwealth Games bronze medallists for Australia
Commonwealth Games medallists in squash
Squash players at the 2010 Commonwealth Games
Squash players at the 2014 Commonwealth Games
Squash players at the 2018 Commonwealth Games
Australian Institute of Sport squash players
People from Grafton, New South Wales
Competitors at the 2009 World Games
Competitors at the 2013 World Games
Sportsmen from New South Wales
20th-century Australian people
21st-century Australian people
Medallists at the 2010 Commonwealth Games
Medallists at the 2014 Commonwealth Games
Medallists at the 2018 Commonwealth Games